Glen Charlie Pond is a  warm water pond in Wareham, Massachusetts. The pond is part of the Agawam River. Exit 2 off Route 25 eastbound provides direct access along Glen Charlie Road. The pond is developed with summer and year-round homes mostly along the southern and eastern shores. Public access is possible through town-owned land at the gas pipeline crossing. This pond is popular for both warm-water fishing and ice fishing.

External links
Mass Division of Fisheries and Wildlife - Pond map and info
Environmental Protection Agency

Wareham, Massachusetts
Ponds of Plymouth County, Massachusetts
Ponds of Massachusetts